Saint-Louis station (French: Gare de Saint-Louis) is the main railway station in the border town of Saint-Louis, Haut-Rhin, France.

The station is served by regional trains to Mulhouse, Basel and Strasbourg.

References

Railway stations in Haut-Rhin
Railway stations in France opened in 1840
Buildings and structures completed in 1910
Art Nouveau architecture in France
Art Nouveau railway stations